Philip M. Farbman (April 3, 1924 – September 15, 1996) was an American professional basketball player.

Biography
He was born in Brooklyn, New York, to Jewish immigrants Harry and Ida Farbman and was Jewish.  He attended and played basketball at Brooklyn College (1941–43) and City College of New York (1947–48). He entered the US Army in 1943 to fight in World War II.

He was drafted in the first round of the 1948 Draft by the Philadelphia Warriors. He spent one season in the Basketball Association of America (BAA) as a member of the Philadelphia Warriors and Boston Celtics (1948–49).

BAA career statistics

Regular season

References

External links

1924 births
1996 deaths
American men's basketball players
American people of Polish-Jewish descent
Boston Celtics players
Brooklyn Bulldogs men's basketball players
Brooklyn College alumni
CCNY Beavers men's basketball players
Forwards (basketball)
Philadelphia Warriors players
Undrafted National Basketball Association players
United States Army personnel of World War II